The Oil Capital Historic District (OCHD) is an area in downtown Tulsa, Oklahoma that commemorates the success of the oil business in Tulsa during the early 20th century. During this period, Tulsa was widely known as "The Oil Capital of the World." The area is bounded by 3rd Street on the north and 7th Street on the south, Cincinnati Avenue on the east and Cheyenne Avenue on the west.

Early in the 20th century, Oklahoma emerged as a major producer of oil and gas. Many of the companies that would become notable in the energy industry located either their home offices or major regional offices in Downtown Tulsa, often constructing architecturally significant buildings to house them. Supporting companies such as equipment suppliers, banks, insurers, utilities and even hotels quickly followed suit. However, in the late 1960s and early 1970s, when the domestic oil business began to decline and companies began consolidating in other cities, these former office buildings became surplus. Some buildings were converted to other functions, but some others were razed for parking lots or freeways. Tulsans who became concerned about the loss of these historic and cultural landmarks began to work on adapting them for newer and more economic functions. The creation of the Oil Capital Historic District was implemented as a way to slow the losses while the plan was realized.

Building classifications
As part of the application process, all of the significant buildings within the proposed district boundaries were labeled as either "Contributing" or "non-contributing". Buildings in the former category had to meet certain criteria:
Built between 1910 and 1967
Involved in some aspect of the oil business during that time
Had not lost their historical character through remodeling or conversion to other uses

The application states that the district contains 72 resources (69 buildings, 2 sites and one object). These were further classified as 40 contributing, 18 non-contributing and 14 which had previously been listed in the National Register.

The table presented here identifies the buildings contained by the OCHD, as defined in the NRHP application. Data are largely derived from text descriptions in the application. They are listed by street address, beginning in the northeast corner of the district (3rd Street and Cincinnati.Avenue). Several architectural styles are represented in the district: Art Deco, Beaux Arts, Classical Revival, Commercial Style, Greek Revival, Italianate, and Modern Movement. Some buildings do not conform to any particular style.

Oil Industry decline
The importance of Tulsa in the oil industry, as well as the impact of the oil industry on Tulsa, declined as the United States began to rely more heavily on cheaper offshore and imported oil. Major international companies downsized or eliminated their Tulsa offices and moved to cities nearer the coasts, especially after foreign countries began exerting more control over their own oil resources. The Arab Oil Embargo accelerated the trend. The International Petroleum Exposition, which had drawn a record number of visitors in 1966, faded in importance and occurred less frequently until it was permanently cancelled after the 1979 show.

District buildings demolished 1967-2010
Notable buildings in or very near the OCHD that were demolished during the decline of the oil business and the creation of the district include:
 Bethlehem Steel Building, 2nd and Boston, razed in 1970
Bliss Hotel 2nd & Boston, Built in 1929 and razed in February 1973.
 Hunt Building, 4th and Main, better known as the Brown-Dunkin Department Store, demolished in 1970.
Medical Arts Building, 6th and Boulder, demolished in July 1970.
Hotel Tulsa, 3rd and Cincinnati. Demolished 1972. 
Skelly Building, 23 West 4th, A 9-story office of the Skelly Oil companies, demolished.
Orpheum Theater, 12 East 4th Street, opened in 1917 as a vaudeville theater, then switched to movies in 1931. Closed in March 1970 and was demolished in May 1970. It was replaced by the Tulsa Building & Loan Building at 10-12 East 4th.(originally the Edwards Building, built in 1926.)

Current status of selected surviving buildings

First Place Tower
This building was completed in 1973 and previously housed, in succession, the First National Bank of Tulsa and a Citicorp branch. Citicorp vacated the premises in 2012. ONE Gas, Inc. planned to move its headquarters to this building in 2014.

Sinclair Building
According to a Tulsa World article, a Tulsa County District Judge ruled that the City of Tulsa and the Central Park Owners Association Inc. could foreclose on the Sinclair Building because the current owner was in arrears on $270,000 for taxes, fees and penalties. The sale could be sold at a sheriff's auction, after a 30-day appeal period, unless the owner reaches a settlement agreement with the city and other creditors.

Tulsa Club Building

The Tulsa Club was founded in 1925 as a social club for wealthy businessmen. The 11-story building, designed by Bruce Goff, was constructed in 1927 on the northwest corner of Fifth Street and Cincinnati Avenue, next to the Philtower Building. The Tulsa Chamber of Commerce owned 40 percent of the building and the club owned 60 percent. The Chamber of Commerce and other organizations used the lower five floors, while the Tulsa Club occupied the top six and a roof garden. The chamber sold its interest to the club in 1952, when it built a new building at 616 South Boston. The club abandoned the building in 1994.

It is unclear when California investor C. J. Morony acquired the building. It is even less clear why. Space was never rented, but the building was allowed to deteriorate. Squatters moved and several fires were deliberately set inside. The city tried for seven years to get him to correct code violations, pay delinquent taxes and fees.

Bruce Garrett bought the building for $400,000 in April 2013 at a sheriff's sale, and announced plans to renovate it, while preserving the early 20th-century design.

A recent news article recounted that vandals took away door knobs, light fixtures, and practically anything else they could pry loose. They also covered the walls with graffiti. Fires were set three times in two weeks during April, 2010, damaging several rooms and disfiguring the exterior walls with scorch marks. In October, 2010, a more serious fire raged through the ballroom on the ninth floor, creating doubts that the building could be saved.

Although most developers that had been interested in saving the building lost interest, a Tulsa construction company, the Ross Group, bought the structure in 2015 for $1.5 million. Promise Hotels, became an equity partner. These partners felt they could restore the building to usable condition for $24 million. By 2018, they realized the cost would be $33 million. After the hotel reopened in mid-June 2019, Pete Patel, CEO and President of Promise Hotels, told the Tulsa World that the final cost was about $36 million. He also added, “the most expensive hotel in Tulsa, if not in Oklahoma.”

633 South Boston Building
This building was designed by architect Robert Buchner to house the Tulsa office of Ponca City Savings and Loan Company, but has remained vacant for a number of years. The Tulsa Foundation for Architecture was interested in acquiring the building, intending to create a museum of blueprints and other drawings. However, the foundation was unable to raise sufficient funding and the idea was dropped.

8 East 3rd Street Building
The 10-story building at 8 East 3rd Street has been named as the Holarud Building, the McBirney Building and the Parker Building. It was constructed in 1929 as the headquarters for Parker Drilling Company, and was known as the Parker Building. The company extensively remodeled it in 1975, then sold it and relocated to Houston in 2001. Apparently the building remained vacant until Parker Drilling Company reacquired it in 2012, as a result of foreclosure.  The company then sold the building to the Anish Hotel Group, who announced that the building will be converted into a hotel. Since the recent sale, it has been renamed as the 8 East 3rd Street Building.

As of March 2014, the 3rd Street Building project was on hold. Because a large number of hotel projects were being considered for Downtown Tulsa, some concern have arisen about whether there would be sufficient demand for all these to survive. In an interview, Anish Hotel Group founder, Andy Patel, said that the company is also thinking about converting the former Parker Building to residences or office spaces.

Palace Building
Also known as the Excaliber Building and the 324 South Main Building, the structure was reportedly owned by the Tulsa World in 2012. For several years, it had been vacant, except for an Arby's restaurant on the ground floor. Rumors that the building would be demolished were denied by the newspaper.

Petroleum Club Building
The Petroleum Club Building at 601 South Boulder in Tulsa got its name from the private club that moved into its top three floors when it was built in 1963. In 1994, a major fire heavily damaged the top two stories, forcing the club to close, and causing serious smoke damage throughout the rest of the building. The club facilities were rebuilt and the facility remained open until 2011. The decline of the oil business in Tulsa was accompanied by a loss of members in the club, and contributed to heavy financial losses. The club closed in July 2011. However, the building is still referred to locally as the Petroleum Club Building.

Tulsa-based Consumer Affairs reportedly has remodeled the severely damaged top floors and has moved some of its headquarters staff into the new space, according to a brief announcement. A previous article noted that Consumer Affairs is a web-based consumer activist organization that was based in Lake Tahoe, Nevada, before moving to Tulsa in 2010. It had announced when beginning the remodel project that it was considering leasing an additional six floors of the building.

Gallery

Street views

Contributing buildings

Non-contributing buildings

Additional information
National Register of Historic Places Registration Form Retrieved June 19, 2014. (Also available here.)

Notes

References

2010 establishments in Oklahoma
History of Oklahoma
History of the petroleum industry in the United States
Buildings and structures in Tulsa, Oklahoma
Historic districts on the National Register of Historic Places in Oklahoma
National Register of Historic Places in Tulsa, Oklahoma
Chicago school architecture in Oklahoma